The islands of Indonesia, also known as the Indonesian Archipelago or Nusantara, may refer either to the islands comprising the country of Indonesia or to the geographical groups which include its islands.

History 
The exact number of islands comprising Indonesia varies among definitions and sources. According to the Law No 9/1996 on Maritime Territory of Indonesia, of 17,508 officially listed islands within the territory of the Republic of Indonesia. According to a geospatial survey conducted between 2007 and 2010 by the National Coordinating Agency for Survey and Mapping (Bakorsurtanal), Indonesia has 13,466 islands. However, according to earlier survey in 2002 by National Institute of Aeronautics and Space (LAPAN), the Indonesian archipelago has 18,307 islands, and according to the CIA World Factbook, there are 17,508 islands. The discrepancy of the numbers of Indonesian islands was because that the earlier surveys include "tidal islands"; sandy cays and rocky reefs that appear during low tide and are submerged during high tide. According to estimates made by the government of Indonesia 8,844 islands have been named, with 922 of those permanently inhabited. As of 2018, 16,671 island names have been verified by the United Nations Group of Experts on Geographical Names (UNGEGN).

Major islands 
 Sunda Islands
 Greater Sunda Islands
 Java, formerly Jawa Dwipa.
 Sumatra, formerly Swarna Dwipa.
 Borneo: divided between the Indonesian region Kalimantan, the country of Brunei and the Malaysian states of Sabah and Sarawak.
 Sulawesi, formerly Celebes.
 Lesser Sunda Islands
 Bali
 Lombok
 Sumbawa
 Flores
 Sumba
 Timor: divided between Indonesian West Timor and the country of East Timor.
 Maluku Islands (Moluccas)
 New Guinea: divided between the Indonesian provinces of Highland Papua, Papua, South Papua, Southwest Papua and West Papua and the country of Papua New Guinea.

List of islands 
The following islands are listed by province:

Java

Banten
 Panaitan
 Sangiang
 Tinjil
 Umang

Central Java
 Karimunjawa
 Nusa Kambangan
Dungeon's Island

Special Capital Region of Jakarta
 Thousand Islands (Kepulauan Seribu)

East Java
 Bawean
 Gili Iyang Island
 Kangean Islands
 Madura
 Raas
 Nusa Barong
 Raja Island
 Sempu Island

West Java
 Monitor Lizard Island (Pulau Biawak), Indramayu

Sumatra

Aceh
 Banyak Islands
 Tuangku
 Lasia Island
 Simeulue
 Weh

North Sumatra
 Batu Islands
 Berhala on the Strait of Malacca
 Hinako Islands
 Makole Island
 Masa Island
 Nias Islands
 Samosir, Lake Toba

West Sumatra
 Mentawai Islands
 North Pagai
 Siberut
 Sipura
 South Pagai
 Pasumpahan
 Sikuai

Bengkulu
 Enggano Island
 Mega Island

Lampung
 Child of Krakatoa (Anak Krakatau)
 Legundi
 Sebesi
 Sebuku

Riau
 Basu Island
 Bengkalis
 Padang
 Rangsang
 Rupat
 Tebing Tinggi Island

Riau Islands
 Natuna Islands (Kepulauan Natuna)
 Anambas Islands
 Natuna Besar Islands
 South Natuna Islands
 Tambelan Islands
 Badas Islands
 Riau Archipelago
 Batam
 Bintan
 Bulan
 Galang
 Karimun islands
 Great Natuna
 Penyengat
 Great Karimun
 Little Karimun
 Kundur
 Rempang
 Lingga Islands
 Lingga with nearby islands
 Singkep with nearby islands

Bangka-Belitung Islands
 Bangka
 Belitung

Kalimantan

Central Kalimantan
 Damar
 Baning Island
 Buaya Island
 Burung Island

East Kalimantan
 Balabalagan Islands
 Derawan Islands
 Kakaban

North Kalimantan
 Bunyu
 Sebatik: divided between Indonesia and Sabah, East Malaysia
 Tarakan

South Kalimantan
 Laut
 Laut Kecil Islands
 Sebuku

West Kalimantan
 Bawal
 Galam
 Karimata Islands
 Karimata
 Maya

Sulawesi

Central Sulawesi
 Banggai Islands
 Banggai
 Bowokan Islands (Kepulauan Treko)
 Buka Buka
 Peleng
 Masoni Island
 Simatang Island
 Togian Islands
 Togian 
 Tolitoli

North Sulawesi
 Bangka
 Bunaken
 Lembeh
 Manado Tua
 Nain
 Sangihe Islands
 Nanipa
 Bukide
 Sangir Besar
 Siau
 Tagulandang
 Talaud Islands
 Kabaruan
 Karakelang
 Salibabu
 Talise

South Sulawesi
 Pabbiring Islands
 Sabalana Islands
 Selayar Islands
 Selayar Island
 Takabonerate Islands
 Tengah Islands

Southeast Sulawesi
 Buton
 Kabaena
 Muna
 Tukangbesi Islands
 Wakatobi
 Wangiwangi
 Wowoni

Lesser Sunda Islands

Bali
 Bali
 Menjangan Island
 Nusa Lembongan
 Nusa Penida
 Serangan Island
 Nusa Ceningan

East Nusa Tenggara
 Alor Islands
 Alor
 Kepa
 Pantar
 Flores
 Babi Island
 Mules Island
 Komodo
 Gili Lawadarat
 Gili Lawalaut
 Mangiatan Island
 Makasar Island
 Taka Makasar
 Mauwang Island
 Pararambah Island
 Siaba Besar Island
 Siaba Kecil Island
 Mangiatan Island
 Tatawa Island
 Tukoh Pemaroh
 Pararambah Island
 Padar Island
 Batubilah Island
 Padar Kecil Island
 Palu Island
 Pemana Islands
 Rinca
 Gili Motang
 Golo Mori
 Muang Island
 Rohbong Island
 Tukoh Gagak 
 Tukoh Rohbongkoe
 Papagaran Besar Island
 Papagaran Kecil Island
 Batu Island
 Mole Island
 Pengah Besar Island
 Pengah Kecil Island
 Batupengah Island
 Rote Island
 Savu
 Solor Islands
 Adonara
 Lembata
 Solor
 Sumba
 Timor, divided between Indonesia West Timor and the independent nation of East Timor

West Nusa Tenggara
 Gili Islands
 Gili Air
 Gili Trawangan
 Gili Meno
 Banta Island
 Gili Biaha
 Gili Mimpang
 Gili Selang
 Gili Tepekong
 Lombok
 Medang Island
 Moyo Island
 Menjangan Island
 Sangeang
 Satonda
 Sumbawa

Maluku Islands

Maluku
 Aru Islands
 Enu
 Kobroor
 Maikoor
 Trangan
 Wokam
 Babar
 Banda
 Barat Daya Islands
 Damer
 Liran
 Romang
 Wetar
 Boano
 Buru
 Gorong archipelago
 Kai Islands
 Kelang
 Leti Islands
 Lakor
 Leti
 Moa
 Manipa
 Nusa Laut
 Seram
 Ambon
 Osi
 Saparua
 Tanimbar Islands
 Selaru
 Yamdena
 Small volcanic islands in Banda Sea
 Tayandu Islands (Kepulauan Tayando)
 Watubela archipelago

North Maluku
 Bacan, with nearby islands:
 Kasiruta
 Mandioli
 Muari
 Erà Islands
 Halmahera, with nearby islands:
 Makian
 Ternate
 Tidore
 Hiri
 Mare
 Maitara
 Kayoa
 Laluin
 Moti
 Rau
 Kakara
 Meti
 Medi
 Tagalaya
 Cumo
 Widi Islands
 Morotai, with nearby islands:
 Rau
 Obi Islands, which include:
 Bisa
 Gomumu
 Obi
 Obilatu
 Tobalai
 Sula Islands

Western New Guinea 
Islands near the Indonesian half of New Guinea island.

West Papua
 Asia Island
 Karas
 Semai

Southwest Papua
 Ayu Islands
 Palau Ayu
 Palau Reni
 Raja Ampat Islands
 Batanta
 Boo Islands
 Fam Islands
 Misool
 Waigeo
 Gam
 Kawe

Papua
 Biak Islands
 Biak
 Mios Num
 Numfor
 Supiori
 Yapen
 Komoran
 Yos Sudarso

See also 

 List of Indonesian islands by area
 List of Indonesian islands by population

References

Bibliography

 

 
Indonesia
Islands